Helena is an unincorporated community in Marquette County in the U.S. state of Michigan.  The community is located within Turin Township.  As an unincorporated community, Helena has no legally defined boundaries or population statistics of its own.

History
Helena was named for the wife of a railroad official.

References

Unincorporated communities in Marquette County, Michigan
Unincorporated communities in Michigan